Alliance for Democracy and Development may refer to:

Alliance for Democracy and Development (Benin)
Alliance for Democracy and Development (Cameroon)
Alliance for Democracy and Development (Zambia)

See also
Democracy and Development (disambiguation)